The Sun Odyssey 44 DS (Deck Salon) is a French sailboat with a hull that was designed by Philippe Briand, deck and interior by Franck Darnet, Flahault Design and the Jeanneau Design Office. It was designed as a cruiser and first built in 2011.

The boat shares a hull design with the 2011 Sun Odyssey 439.

Production
The design was built by Jeanneau in France, from 2011 to 2018, but it is now out of production.

Design
The Sun Odyssey 44 DS is a recreational keelboat, built predominantly of polyester fiberglass, with wood trim. The hull is solid fiberglass, while deck uses the Prisma injection-molding process. It has a 9/10 fractional sloop rig, with a deck-stepped mast, two sets of swept spreaders and aluminum spars with 1X19 stainless steel wire rigging. The hard chine hull has a plumb stem, a walk-through reverse transom with a swimming platform, an internally mounted spade-type rudder controlled by dual wheels and a fixed "L"-shaped fin keel with a weighted bulb or optional shoal-draft keel. The boat displaces  and carries  of cast iron ballast.

The design has sleeping accommodation for four to six people, with a double "V"-berth in the bow cabin, a "U"-shaped settee and a straight settee in the main cabin and an aft cabin with a double island berth. A third cabin maybe installed forward to port, with two staggered bunk beds. The galley is located on the starboard side at the companionway ladder. The galley is "L"-shaped and is equipped with a three-burner stove, an ice box and a double sink. A navigation station is opposite the galley, on the port side. There are two heads, one in the bow cabin on the starboard side and one on the port side of the companionway.

Operational history
In a 2012 Cruising World review, Alvah Simon concluded, "the 44 DS won’t necessarily attract the performance-oriented sailor. Nor will it appeal to the aesthetic eye of the traditionalists. But for those looking for a large, cheerful, modern living space, with ample sailing and powering ability to carry them in comfort to far-flung destinations, the 44 DS deserves an inspection."

In a Boats.com review in 2012, Zuzana Prochazka wrote, "with the new hull design, the Jeanneau 44DS not only looks fast, it sails fast—and with various sail plan options, is easily sailed by a couple. The ergonomic deck also provides lots of room and is easy to move about without a lot of shin banging obstacles."

A 2017 review by Adam Cort for Sail Magazine, "I didn’t expect much from this boat, but the Jeanneau Sun Odyssey 44DS is living proof that looks and good performance don't have to be mutually exclusive. The day of our test sail was gray and blustery, gusting to 20 knots out of the northeast, and the 44DS couldn't have been happier. Unrolling the main and jib just off the Jeanneau office in Eastport, Maryland, the boat quickly accelerated to 7 knots and more on a close reach. Equally important, it quickly locked into a groove, slicing through the chop cleanly in a way that required almost no effort at the helm."

See also
List of sailing boat types

References

External links

Keelboats
2010s sailboat type designs
Sailing yachts
Sailboat type designs by Philippe Briand
Sailboat type designs by Franck Darnet
Sailboat type designs by Flahault Design
Sailboat type designs by Jeanneau Design Office
Sailboat types built by Jeanneau